The Henderson ground dove (Pampusana leonpascoi), or Henderson Island ground dove, is an extinct species of bird in the family Columbidae. It was described from Holocene to possibly Late Pleistocene-aged subfossil remains found on Henderson Island in the Pitcairn Group in 1991. Its relatively small wings suggest it was flightless.

References

Henderson ground dove
Birds of Henderson Island
Extinct birds of Oceania
Holocene extinctions
Henderson ground dove
Fossil taxa described in 2003